The Supermarine Seamew was a British twin engined  amphibian, built by the Supermarine company, intended as a small, shipborne aircraft.

Design and development
The British Air Ministry placed an order for two Seamews in 1925, to meet Specification 29/24. The Seamew featured a wooden hull and two bay folding biplane wings with mainplanes utilizing a wood and metal composite construction with fabric covering and braced tail unit with twin fins and rudders. The aircraft was powered by two  geared Armstrong Siddeley Lynx IV radial engines mounted between the wings, driving two-bladed tractor propellers. As an amphibian, it had a retractable main undercarriage with fixed tailskid. The crew of three had a single pilot in the nose cockpit, a forward gunner behind the pilot but forward of the lower wing and rear gunner aft of the lower wing.

Development of the Seamew was slow, as Supermarine were busy with other projects, including the Southampton flying boat and the S.4 and Supermarine S.5 racing floatplanes for the Schneider Trophy. The Seamew first prototype N212 made its maiden flight on 9 January 1928.

Operational history
Testing showed several major problems with the Seamew. The aircraft was nose heavy in flight, and water spray during take-off damaged the  diameter propellers. The second prototype was fitted with reduced diameter, four-bladed propellers in an attempt to reduce the spray damage problem, but these gave a poor rate of climb. Another problem was corrosion of stainless steel fittings. These required replacing at considerable expense and as the type was unsatisfactory, the two prototypes were instead scrapped in 1930.

Operators

Royal Air Force

Specifications (Seamew)

Notes and references
Notes

Bibliography
 Andrews, C.N. and Morgan, E.B. Supermarine Aircraft since 1914, Second edition. London: Putnam, 1987. .
 London, Peter. British Flying Boats. Stroud, Gloucestershire, UK: Sutton Publishing, 2003. .

Further reading

 
 

1920s British military reconnaissance aircraft
Flying boats
Seamew
Biplanes
Amphibious aircraft
Aircraft first flown in 1928
Twin piston-engined tractor aircraft